Hikawera Te Po "Hika" Elliot (born 22 January 1986) is a New Zealand Maori rugby union player, he currently plays for Nevers in the French Pro D2 competition.

Rugby career
Elliot has represented and progressed through all levels of rugby in New Zealand. In 2004 he was part of the Under 19 team that won the World Championship in South Africa while he was still in school. He was also part of the New Zealand Under 21 and School Boys rugby team, captaining the latter.

Elliot also plays for Taranaki Rugby Union in the ITM Cup.

He was called as a replacement for Andrew Hore in the All Blacks tour of UK and Ireland. Hore had sprained his ankle during their 2008 Bledisloe Cup match in Hong Kong. He played in their game against Munster. He was last named in the All Blacks 2010 end-of-year tour to Hong Kong, UK and Ireland.

Outside rugby
Elliot also has some sporting experience outside of rugby. He has represented New Zealand in age group basketball and has a black belt in Kung Fu. He comes from an extensive martial arts family background. In 2008 he qualified for the Karate World Championships held in Japan.

References

External links
 
 Hikawera Elliot Chiefs Profile

1986 births
New Zealand rugby union players
New Zealand Māori rugby union players
New Zealand international rugby union players
Chiefs (rugby union) players
Hurricanes (rugby union) players
Hawke's Bay rugby union players
Counties Manukau rugby union players
Taranaki rugby union players
Rugby union hookers
Rugby union players from Hastings, New Zealand
People educated at Hastings Boys' High School
Living people